KDLS (1310 AM) is a commercial radio station serving the Perry, Iowa area.  Until February 2010, the station broadcast Timeless Favorites. After the shutdown of Timeless Favorites at that same month, the station has broadcast primarily a Kool Gold format.  Although both stations share the same call letters, KDLS AM does not have the same ownership as KDLS-FM.

Until January 31, 2012, KDLS was licensed to Coon Valley Communications, Inc.  Coon Valley Communications also owned KGRA 98.9 FM in Jefferson and KKRF 107.9 FM in Stuart.  Coon Valley Communications was owned by Patrick Delaney of Perry.

On February 1, 2012, Patrick Delany, owner of Coon Valley Communications, Inc, sold his company to Mel Suhr of Knoxville, owner of M&M Broadcasting, Inc.

With an agreement reached on January 27, 2012, and having an effective purchase date of February 1, 2012, M&M Broadcasting, Inc, a subsidiary of M and H Broadcasting, Inc, purchased Coon Valley Communications.   M and H Broadcasting, Inc is owned by Mel and Holly Suhr of Knoxville, Iowa.  M and H Broadcasting, Inc also owns KRLS 92.1 FM and KNIA 1320 AM at Knoxville.  They also own Home Broadcasting, Inc which owns KCII 1380 AM and KCII-FM 106.1 FM at Washington.

The KDLS antenna system uses three towers arranged in a directional array that concentrates the signal toward the west.  The towers are located east of Perry near the intersection of Hwy 169 and Hwy 141.

References

External links
Raccoon Valley Radio Facebook
Raccoon Valley Radio

DLS